Hamzar (also Romanized as Hamzārʿ) is a village in Keybar Rural District, Jolgeh Zozan District, Khaf County, Razavi Khorasan Province, Iran. At the 2006 census, its population was 143, in 31 families.

References 

Populated places in Khaf County